No Place to Hide is a 1956 film directed, produced and written by Josef Shaftel. It stars Marsha Hunt and David Brian and was said to be the first film made "cooperatively between Hollywood and Philippine interests."

Plot

Cast

References

External links
 

1956 films
1956 drama films
Films shot in the Philippines